Mehmet Oğuz (3 May 1949 – 27 November 2022), popularly known as Big Mehmet, was a Turkish footballer who played for the Turkey national team, as well as Galatasaray and Fenerbahçe.

Club career 
Mehmet Oğuz was born in Istanbul on 3 May 1949. He started his footballing career with Kadirga SK. He later joined the Galatasaray junior team and was promoted to the senior squad where he became part of the starting eleven. He was nicknamed Big Mehmet in order to differentiate him from his teammate Mehmet Özgül. Oğuz won three championships in a row with Galatasaray and he became the club's captain in the 1970s.

At Galatasaray, Oğuz was part of the team that won the 1968–69 1.Lig, 1971–72 1.Lig and 1972–73 1.Lig Turkish League. He also won the 1972–73, 1968–69 and 1975–76 Turkish Cups with the same club.

In the 1979–80 season, Galatasaray did not extend his contract and he moved to Fenerbahçe with the help of Cemil Turan. He was with the club for a season and retired on 30 November 1980 with a match between Fenerbahçe and Beşiktaş.

International career 
Mehmet Oğuz played six times for the Turkey U21 national team and 19 times for the Turkey senior national team. He scored three goals in 25 caps.

Death 
Oğuz died of heart related problems on 27 November 2022, at the age of 73. His funeral prayer was conducted at Ataköy 5th Section Mosque before he was buried.

References 

1949 births
2022 deaths
People from Istanbul
Turkish footballers
Association football midfielders
Turkey international footballers
Süper Lig players
Fenerbahçe S.K. footballers
Galatasaray S.K. footballers